Edward Hughes (14 September 1832 – 14 May 1908) was a British artist who specialised in portrait painting.

Career
Edward Hughes was born in Pentonville, London, the son of the artist George Hughes. From an early age his artistic ability was recognised. In 1846 he entered the Royal Academy schools and a year later was awarded a silver medal by the Royal Society of Arts for a chalk drawing. Between 1847 and 1884 Hughes exhibited 36 paintings at the Royal Academy.  He also worked as an illustrator, collaborating with George du Maurier in producing the images for the Wilkie Collins book Poor Miss Finch. About 1878 he moved more or less exclusively into portrait painting, drawing praise from John Everett Millais for his representation of women.

Royal Commissions
Hughes received his first royal commission in 1895 which resulted in a full-length portrait of Queen Mary. This painting is exhibited in the vestibule of Buckingham Palace. He painted at least three portraits of Queen Alexandra and produced images of Louise, Princess Royal, Princess Victoria of the United Kingdom, the Queen of Norway, the Duchess of Teck, the Prince of Wales (the future George V), his brother Prince Albert, and his sister Princess Mary. A number of his paintings remain in the Royal Collection.

Personal life
Hughes, who married twice, died on 14 May 1908 and is buried on the outside of the Circle of Lebanon in Highgate Cemetery.

His eldest daughter and biographer Alice Hughes became a portrait photographer.

References

External links
Portraits associated with Edward Hughes at the National Portrait Gallery

Gallery

19th-century British artists
20th-century British artists
Burials at Highgate Cemetery
1832 births
1908 deaths